Calosoma planicolle is a species of ground beetle in the subfamily of Carabinae. It was described by Chaudoir in 1869.

References

planicolle
Beetles described in 1869